, known professionally as , is a Japanese actor who works primarily in British films and television.

In recent years, he has had roles in major films such as Revolver, Memoirs of a Geisha,  The Last Samurai, and A Matter of Size.  
Additionally, Igawa provides the voices of Professor Moshimo in Robotboy, and Hiro in the Thomas & Friends franchise starting with 2009's Hero of the Rails. Besides these, he also appears in 2011's Johnny English Reborn, the sequel to Johnny English, as English's Tibetan guru and is in the 2012 film Gambit playing businessman Takagawa.

His television roles have included appearances in Lovejoy, Yu-Gi-Oh, The IT Crowd, Torchwood, Casualty, Archer, Doctor Who and The Crown.

Igawa voiced the main villain Colonel Lee in the video game Crysis Warhead and the Yakuza character Jiro in the 2013 video game Payday 2.

Personal life
Igawa lives in England with his wife Adrienne Baba. He became the first Japanese member of The Royal Shakespeare Company in 1986.

Filmography

Film
 Kagirinaku toumei ni chikai blue (1979) as Okinawa
 The Man Who Shot Christmas (1984) as Koji
 Half Moon Street (1986) as Japanese Waiter
 Just like a Woman (1992) as Akira Watanabe
 Incognito (1998) as Agachi
 Eyes Wide Shut (1999) as Japanese Man #1
 The Nine Lives of Tomas Katz (1999) as Japanese Scuba Diver
 The Last Samurai (2003) as General Hasegawa
 Code 46 (2004) as a Driver
 Revolver (2005) as Fred
 Memoirs of a Geisha (2005) as Tanaka
 Irish Jam (2006) as Mr. Suzuki
 Speed Racer (2008) as Tetsuo Togokahn
 The Hedgehog (2009) as Kakuro Ozu
 Hero of the Rails (2009) as Hiro (voice)
 A Matter of Size (2009) as Kitano
 Ninja (2009) as Sensei Takeda
 Misty Island Rescue (2010) as Hiro (voice)
 Johnny English Reborn (2011) as Ting Wang
 Gambit (2012) as Takagawa
 King of the Railway (2013) as Hiro (voice)
 47 Ronin (2013) as Tengu Lord (voice)
 Hector and the Search for Happiness (2014) as Old Monk
 Street Fighter: Assassin's Fist (2014) as Gotetsu
 Everly (2014) as Sadist
 The Confessions (2016) as Japanese minister
 The Gentlemen (2019) as Wang Yong (Dry Eye's uncle)
 The Host (2020)
 Tetris (2023) as Hiroshi Yamauchi

Television
 Gems (1985–1986) as Mr. Horikoshi/Mr. Jima
 Never the Twain (1988) as Japanese tourist
 Small World (1988) as Prof. Motakazu Umeda
 Forever Green (1989) as Mr. Okisawa
 Screen Two (1989) as Hiroto
 Lovejoy (1992) as Mr. Kashimoto
 Yu-Gi-Oh! (second series anime) (2005) as Jafar Shin (voice)
 Robotboy (2005–2008) as Professor Moshimo
 The IT Crowd (2006, 2008) as Yamamoto
 Torchwood (2006) as Dr. Tanizaki
 Thomas & Friends (2010–2020) as Hiro (voice)
 Casualty (2014) as Than Sein
 Marco Polo (2014) as Chuluun
 Archer (2015) as Kentaro Sato (voice)
 Doctor Who (2017) as Secretary General
 The Amazing World of Gumball (2017) as Mr Yoshida, Mystical Narrator (voice)
 Doctors (2017) as Akio Tanaka
 Origin (2018) as Eiichi Yagami
 The Crown (2019) as Emperor Hirohito

Video games
 Shogun: Total War (2001) as Narrator
 Perfect Dark Zero (2005) as Zhang Li
 Genji: Days of the Blade (2006) as Musashibo Benkei
 Crysis Warhead (2008) as Colonel Lee
 Payday 2 (2015) as Jiro
 Total War: Shogun 2 (2010, cooperating with Sega and Creative Assembly) as game's narrator
 Evil Genius 2: World Domination (2021) as Jubei
 Wolfstride'' (2020) as Oyabun

References

External links
Official website

Living people
Male actors from Tokyo
Japanese male film actors
Japanese expatriates in the United Kingdom
20th-century Japanese male actors
21st-century Japanese male actors
Royal Shakespeare Company members
Japanese male stage actors
Japanese male television actors
Japanese male video game actors
Japanese male voice actors
1946 births